Tjernsrud was a station on the Kolsås Line (line 6, now Line 3) on the Oslo Metro system. Located in Bærum, Norway, it was between Ringstabekk and Jar, 9.9 km west of Stortinget. It served the neighborhoods of northern Stabekk and southeastern Jar.

The station was opened on 1 July 1924 as part of the tramway Bærum Line.

Along with most of the line, Tjernsrud was closed for upgrades since 1 July 2006. From August 2007 its service was temporarily provided by tram line 13, as an extension of the service from Jar to Bekkestua. It was decided not to reopen Tjernsrud as a metro station, and as the tram service ended in February 2009, it was demolished soon after.

The company responsible for public transport in Oslo, Ruter, has the long-term objective of opening the Kolsås Line for Metro use again.

References

Oslo Metro stations in Bærum
Oslo Tramway stations in Bærum
Railway stations opened in 1924
Railway stations closed in 2009
Disused Oslo Metro stations
1924 establishments in Norway
2009 disestablishments in Norway